Cock o' the Walk is a 1930 American pre-Code drama film directed by Walter Lang. The film is now considered to be lost.

Plot
Carlos Lopez is an aspiring violinist in Buenos Aires, who pursues and is pursued by many married women. He ends up making enemies of married men in the city.

Cast
 Joseph Schildkraut as Carlos Lopez
 Myrna Loy as Narita
 Philip Sleeman as José
 Edward Peil Sr. as Ortega (as Edward Peil)
 John Beck as Cafe Manager
 Olive Tell as Rosa Vallejo
 Wilfred Lucas as Señor Vallejo
 Frank Jonasson as Pedro
 Sally Long as Paulina Castra
 Natalie Joyce as Maria

References

External links
 

1930 films
1930 drama films
1930 lost films
American black-and-white films
American drama films
1930s English-language films
Films directed by Walter Lang
Lost American films
Lost drama films
1930s American films